The Senegalese Super Cup is an annual basketball game competition. It consists out of one game which is played in the beginning of the season, between the champions of the Nationale 1 and the winners of the Saint Michel Cup.

Finals

References

See also
Nationale 1 (Senegal)
Saint Michel Cup

Basketball competitions in Senegal
Basketball cup competitions in Africa